Beekse Bergen may refer to:

Safaripark Beekse Bergen
Speelland Beekse Bergen